Irena Dubrovna is the name of Simone Simon's character in the 1942 movie Cat People.

Plot

When naval construction designer Oliver Reed (Kent Smith) meets the Serbian Irena Dubrovna (Simone Simon) in the zoo, he flirts with her and they soon fall in love and marry each other. However, Irena is haunted by an ancient curse of her home village that claims "cat women" can not be touched by a man otherwise they will transform into a panther and kill their partner, thus the couple does not consummate their marriage. Irena is sent for treatment with the psychiatrist Dr. Louis Judd (Tom Conway), while Oliver looks for "consolation" with his colleague Alice Moore (Jane Randolph). When Irena sees that she is losing Oliver to Alice, she becomes jealous and hateful, leading to a tragic end.

Popular culture

The DC Comics anti-hero Catwoman uses the name Irene Dubrovna as an alias at several points.

References

Fictional werecats
Fictional Serbian people
Female horror film villains